HMS Umbra (P35) was a Royal Navy U-class submarine built by Vickers-Armstrongs at Barrow-in-Furness. So far she has been the only ship of the Royal Navy to bear the name Umbra.

Career

She spent most of the war in the Mediterranean, where she sank the Italian cargo ships , Francesco Barbaro, Sacro Cuore, Emilio Morandi, the Italian transport ship Manfredo Campiero, and the German cargo ship . She also sank the Italian salvage vessel Rampino, and picked up her sole survivor, and torpedoed and sank the damaged  on 15 June 1942. Trento had already been damaged by a torpedo from a British Beaufort aircraft (No. 217 Squadron RAF based at Malta).

Umbra also torpedoed and destroyed the grounded Italian supply ship Amsterdam on 23 October 1942, and sank the Italian tug Pronta that was trying to salvage the Amsterdam. The Amsterdam had been grounded after being hit by a torpedo in an air attack. Umbra also damaged the  Italian troop ship Piemonte and the Italian cargo ship Napoli. The ship was beached and later destroyed by aircraft. She later attacked and damaged the German troop ship Macedonia north of Sousse, Tunisia. The damaged German ship was beached and abandoned. She also launched an attack on the Italian cargo ship Nino Bixio, but missed her.

One of her last actions was to attack the Italian sailing vessels Nuovo Domenico and Concetta Falco by gunfire in the Gulf of Hammamet on 11 January 1943. Nuovo Domenico was damaged in the attack.

She survived the war, was sold for scrap on 9 July 1946, and was broken up at Blyth.

See also

References
 
 
 

 

British U-class submarines
Ships built in Barrow-in-Furness
1941 ships
World War II submarines of the United Kingdom